Copacabana Airport is an extremely high elevation airport serving Copacabana, a town on Lake Titicaca in the La Paz Department of Bolivia.

Town and airport are on a peninsula connected to Peru, with no land connection with Bolivia. There is rising terrain in all quadrants except west-southwest, over the lake.

See also

Transport in Bolivia
List of airports in Bolivia

References

External links 
OpenStreetMap - Copacabana
OurAirports - Copacabana
SkyVector - Copacabana
Fallingrain - Copacabana Airport

Airports in La Paz Department (Bolivia)